Steve, Steven, or Stephen Hawkins may refer to:

Steve Hawkins, an American college basketball coach
Steven W. Hawkins, an American social justice leader and litigator 
Stephen Hawkins, an Australian lightweight rower

See also
Stephen Hawking, an English theoretical physicist, cosmologist, and author